Loza may refer to:

Places
Loza, Álava, a village in the Basque Country, Spain
Loza, Bulgaria, a village in Gabrovo Province, Bulgaria
Loza (Plzeň-North District), a municipality and village in the Czech Republic
Łoza, a village in Sztum County, Poland
Łoża, a village in Człuchów County, Poland

Rivers
 Loza River, a river in northern Madagascar that crosses Antsohihy

People
Loza (surname)

See also